The 1996 Canisius Golden Griffins football team represented Canisius College in the 1996 NCAA Division I-AA football season. The Golden Griffins offense scored 158 points while the defense allowed 108 points.

The 1996 season was the only season in which the Golden Griffins had a winning record at the Division I level (its last winning season up to that point, 1990, had come when the team was still in Division III) and the last time the team would ever have a winning season.

Schedule

References

Canisius
Canisius Golden Griffins football seasons
Canisius Golden Griffins football